Beverly Grove is an area within the Beverly–Fairfax neighborhood in the Mid-City West region of Los Angeles, California.

Geography

City of Los Angeles
The term "Beverly Grove" was first used in 2006 to unofficially refer to a small residential area that was proposed to be subject to an anti-mansionization ordinance. It referred to an area in the Wilshire Community Plan area that was generally bounded by Colgate Avenue on the north, Fairfax Avenue on the east, Lindenhurst Avenue on the south, and San Vicente Boulevard on the west.

===Los Angeles Times''' Mapping L.A. boundaries===

In a departure from its first draft, the Los Angeles Times Mapping L.A. project maps Beverly Grove as bounded on the north and west by the West Hollywood and Beverly Hills city limits, on the east by Fairfax Avenue and on the south by Wilshire Boulevard and San Vicente Boulevard.

It abuts the city limits of Beverly Hills to the west, West Hollywood to the north, Fairfax and Mid-Wilshire to the east, and Carthay to the south.http://projects.latimes.com/mapping-la/neighborhoods/region/central-la/ "Central L.A.," Mapping L.A., Los Angeles Times

In the first draft of Mapping L.A., "Beverly Grove" was not included as a distinct neighborhood; rather, the area was shown as part of the Fairfax District. The Times'' database editor and its map project's coordinator later acknowledged in 2014 that "Beverly Grove" had not been a well established name.

History

According to the Los Angeles Conservancy, the Beverly Grove area was built primarily in the 1920s and has a "combination of quiet charm and close proximity to shopping, restaurants, and museums".

In 2008, the city adopted ordinance 182754 which amended Section 12.04 of the Los Angeles Municipal Code by amending the zoning map because "the area unofficially known as Beverly Grove (located in the Wilshire Community Plan and generally bounded by Colgate Avenue on the north, Fairfax Avenue on the east, Lindenhurst Avenue on the south, and San Vicente Boulevard on the west) continues to experience out-of-scale development with a noticeable increase in demolitions and the construction of new single-family dwellings. A Residential Floor Area Supplemental Use District (RFA) was created to "in order to ensure that new development matches the scale and character of existing buildings in the surrounding area".

Demographics
The following data applies to the boundaries set by Mapping L.A.:

The 2000 U.S. census counted 21,417 residents in the 1.65-square-mile neighborhood—an average of 12,990 people per square mile, fairly normal for Los Angeles. In 2008, the city estimated that the population had increased to 22,855. The median age for residents was 38, old for both the city and the county.

The percentage of white people living in the area was 82%. Other ethnicities in 2000 were Latinos, 6%;  Asians, 5,1%; blacks, 2%; and others, 4.9%.   Iran (20.2%) and Poland (7.4%) were the most common places of birth for the 36.3% of the residents who were born abroad, a figure that was considered average for the city as a whole.

The median household income in 2020 dollars was $94,676, considered high for Los Angeles. Renters occupied 72% of the housing units, and house or apartment owners the rest.

The percentages of never-married men and women, 53.2% and 40.5%, respectively, were among the county's highest.

Education
Half of Beverly Grove residents aged 25 and older possessed a four-year degree in 2000, a high rate for both the city and the county. The percentage of residents with a master's degree was also high.

Perutz Etz Jacob Hebrew Academy, a private elementary school at 7951 Beverly Boulevard, was the only school operating in the neighborhood.

Notable places

 The Beverly Center. Opened in 1982 by developers A. Alfred Taubman, Sheldon Gordon and E. Phillip Lyon, it features various designer stores and restaurants. The site's former occupant was a small amusement park known as Beverly Park.
Edinburgh Bungalow Court: Spanish Colonial Revival complex, Los Angeles historic-cultural monument No. 1105 designated in 2016 on the corner of Edinburgh and Waring avenues.
 The Four Seasons Hotel Los Angeles at Beverly Hills. A luxury, five-star hotel. 
 Third Street shopping district. Located between Fairfax and La Cienega.

See also

 List of districts and neighborhoods of Los Angeles

References

External links
 Los Angeles Times: Beverly Grove map and statistics
 Los Angeles Times: Beverly Grove crime map and statistics

Neighborhoods in Los Angeles
Wilshire, Los Angeles
Central Los Angeles
Westside (Los Angeles County)